Diana de Feo (9 March 1937 – 23 June 2021) was an Italian journalist and politician who served as a Senator.

References

1937 births
2021 deaths
Italian journalists
Italian politicians
Senators of Legislature XVI of Italy
The People of Freedom politicians
Journalists from Turin
Politicians from Turin